Suni (Neotragus moschatus) is a small species of antelope.

Suni can also refer to:

Places
 Suni (geography), a vegetation zone of the Andes
 Suni, Sardinia, a municipality in Italy

People
 Sunisa "Suni" Lee (born 2003), American gymnast
 Súni Olsen (born 1981), a Faroese association football player
 Suni Paz, an Argentinian musician
 Grikor Suni (1876–1939), an Armenian composer
 Janne Suni, a Finnish musician, demoscener and pixel artist
 Leo Suni (1891–1942), a Finnish Olympic diver
 Paul Suni (born 1956), an American engineer
 Simple Suni (born 1986), an Indian film director, producer and songwriter
 Sunita Williams (born 1965), a former American astronaut and a U.S. Navy officer

See also
 Seoni, Himachal Pradesh, a town in India

 Sunni Islam, a major branch of Islam